Death of a Salesman is a 1951 American drama film adapted from the 1949 play of the same name by Arthur Miller. It was directed by László Benedek and written for the screen by Stanley Roberts. The film received many honors, including four Golden Globe Awards, the Volpi Cup and five Oscar nominations. Alex North, who wrote the music for the Broadway production, was one of the five Academy Award nominees for the film's musical score.

Plot 
Willy Loman has led a life consisting of 60 years of failure. Loman's wife supports him, but he soon begins to lose his grip on reality and slips between the past and the present, frantically trying to find where he went wrong.

Cast 
 Fredric March as Willy Loman
 Mildred Dunnock as Linda Loman
 Kevin McCarthy as Biff Loman
 Cameron Mitchell as Happy Loman
 Howard Smith as Charley
 Royal Beal as Ben
 Don Keefer as Bernard
 Jesse White as Stanley
 Claire Carleton as Miss Francis
 David Alpert as Howard Wagner

Career of a Salesman
Just before the film was about to be released, Arthur Miller threatened to sue Columbia Studios over the short that was to appear before Death of a Salesman. This short film, Career of a Salesman, showed what the producers believed was a more typical American salesman, and was an attempt to defuse possible accusations that Death of a Salesman was an anti-American film. Eventually, Columbia agreed to remove the 10-minute short from the film's theatrical run.

Miller saw Career of a Salesman as an attack upon his work, proclaiming: "Why the hell did you make the picture if you're so ashamed of it? Why should anybody not get up and walk out of the theater if Death of a Salesman is so outmoded and pointless?" He argued against the portrayal of the salesman profession as "a wonderful profession, that people thrived on it, and there were no problems at all." Eventually, the very attitude that led Columbia to commission the intro film led to the failure of Death of a Salesman: Businessmen and other people in the political climate of the 1950s tried to distance themselves from a film depicting American failure.

Production
Benedek took great care in making the film a close transcription of the play. In many places, the film uses Miller's lines verbatim, sometimes leaving out only small lines of dialogue. However, the playwright claimed that the movie was ruined by the truncation of key scenes. In fact, the playwright had no involvement with or control over the film. Benedek also stressed the dreary, middle class setting of the film, using small rooms and gray shots.

The cast consisted principally of the Broadway cast, with the addition of Kevin McCarthy from the original London cast. However, Fredric March replaced Broadway actor Lee J. Cobb after concerns arose over Cobb's alleged past with leftist politics.

Reception
Though the film won over many film critics and received nominations for many awards, it was a box-office failure. The subject matter, the failure of the American dream, did not appeal to many of the era's moviegoers. Miller hated the adaptation of his play. He also claimed that, although he wrote the play cinematically, Benedek managed to "chop off almost every climax of the play as though with a lawnmower" and portray Loman as a lunatic rather than a victim.

Restoration and home video 
Death of a Salesman has been released on DVD format by Movies Unlimited. It has also been made available on various streaming platforms, such as Amazon Prime Video.

In 2013, a digital restoration of the film was undertaken by Sony. The digital pictures were digitally restored, frame by frame, at Prasad Corporation to remove dirt, tears, scratches and other artifacts. The restoration was part of the Stanley Kramer 100-year celebration (Kramer would have been 100 years old on September 29, 2013).

Awards and nominations

New York Times Critics' Pick
 Top 1,000

References

External links

 
 

1951 films
1951 drama films
American drama films
American black-and-white films
Films scored by Alex North
Films scored by Morris Stoloff
American films based on plays
Films directed by László Benedek
Films whose director won the Best Director Golden Globe
Films featuring a Best Drama Actor Golden Globe winning performance
Films set in Brooklyn
Films produced by Stanley Kramer
Columbia Pictures films
Films based on works by Arthur Miller
1950s English-language films
1950s American films